Deh-e Aqa (also Romanized as Deh-e Āqā and Deh Āqā; also known as Deh Āgha) is a village in Hendudur Rural District, Sarband District, Shazand County, Markazi Province, Iran. At the 2006 census, its population was 112, in 19 families.

References 

Populated places in Shazand County